Rik De Mil (born 15 September 1981) is a Belgian professional football manager and former player who is an assistant coach at Belgian First Division A side Club Brugge. As a player, he was a goalkeeper.

Coaching career 
De Mil coached Club NXT, the reserve of Club Brugge, during the side's 2020–21 season in the Belgian First Division B. In June 2022, he was replaced as Club NXT coach by Nicky Hayen.

References

External links 
 Rik De Mil at Club Brugge

1981 births
Living people
People from Eeklo
Belgian footballers
Association football goalkeepers
Belgian football managers
Club Brugge KV non-playing staff
Club NXT
Footballers from East Flanders